CANAL8 Sport was a Danish television channel owned by TV4 Group and C More Entertainment.

The channel was announced on July 3, 2012. The channel replaced Canal+ Sport 1 in Denmark.

The reason for this is that after Canal+ lost the rights to the Premier League in 2010, they have a hard time keeping the subscribers in Denmark to their premium sports package.
And thus it was decided to move the most popular sport with Danish viewer interest from a high pay channel to an advertising financing low pay channel. the channel is first of all a football channel and show matches from Danish Superliga, UEFA Europa League, La Liga, Serie A and Eredivisie and other sports like UFC fighting, ATP Tennis, Indycar Racing and Swedish Hockey League.

Following this decision, the C More Sports package was not made available in Denmark.

An HD version of Canal 8 Sport was launched on June 3, 2013.

In the Summer of 2015, Discovery Networks Northern Europe purchase the channel, and on July 1, 2015 it merged with Eurosport 2 into a new sportschannel called Eurosport DK.

History

2012
Canal 8 Sport was from the start August 13, 2012 available in the Danish cable networks YouSee and Stofa and on satellite via Canal Digital, while negotiations are ongoing with the other Danish operators. incl. Boxer TV A/S

On December 17, 2012, the channel became available in Viasat's sportspackage on satellite and on IPTV Network Waoo together with Canal 9

2013
On April 20, 2013 it was announced that the HD version will be launched on Monday June 3, 2013 

On September 2, 2003 it was announced that Canal 8 Sport will become available in Boxer TV A/S's digital terrestrial television network in Denmark on September 26, 2013 together with C More's other channel C More Series & the VOD service C More Play.

2014
Because of UFC started their own streaming service UFC Fight Pass could Canal 9 & Canal 8 Sport not get the extension of their rights to the UFC PPV and UFC Fight Night, but they would still be able to show the UFC's TV shows like UFC Unleashed, UFC Main Event & classics WEC Events. This was announced on their Facebook page on January 4, 2014.

On March 1, 2014 it was announced that C More & Canal 9 & Canal 8 Sport in Denmark has made a new deal with UFC, they get the rights to the UFC PPV and UFC Fight Night for 2014 & 2015. This was announced on their Facebook page.

On March 14, 2014 it emerged that TV4 Group and C More Entertainment, might sell Canal8 Sports and Canal 9 in Denmark because of the poor economy, according to the newspaper BT, they are currently negotiating with TV 2 Denmark and SBS Discovery Media.

On June 26, 2014, it was announced that Canal 9 & Canal 8 Sport had lost one of their strongest football rights, The Danish Superliga from the 2015–16season, to Viasat and SBS Discovery Media.

Later on June 26, 2014, it was announced that Discovery Networks Northern Europe and C More Entertainment has entered into an agreement that Discovery Networks Northern Europe has the option to purchase Canal 8 Sport and Canal 9 of C More Entertainment in 2015.
The Agreement is an extension of the SBS Discovery Media has just signed a six-year agreement for the rights to two weekly matches from The Danish Superliga. The two matches as SBS Discovery Media bought is the 2nd and 5th match the selection from every round (the matches that Canal 9 has been showing since 2009) and the agreement will take effect from season 2015/16 and will run for six years. And the plan is to continue The Danish Superliga on Canal 8 Sport and Canal 9 after summer 2015.

The agreement with C More Entertainment also means that Discovery Networks Northern Europe August 1, 2014 will takes over the sale of television advertising on the two channels.

On July 18, 2014, Canal 9 & Canal 8 Sport announced on their Facebook page that they had not extended their right to Eredivisie.

On September 26, 2014 Discovery Networks Northern Europe announced that they would use the option and buy Canal 8 Sport and Canal 9, the purchase must be approved by the Danish competition authorities and the purchase is expected to take in place during 2015.

2015
On May 27, 2015, The Danish competition authorities announced that they have approved Discovery Networks Northern Europe purchase of Canal 8 Sport & Canal 9, they take over the channels from July 1, 2015.

On May 28, 2015, Discovery Networks Northern Europe announced that they will merge Canal 8 Sport and Eurosport 2 in to Eurosport DK in Denmark from July 1, 2015, and take the rights fra the two channel in to one channel and with the best from Eurosport but now in Danish with more rights targeting Danish viewers, and with 2,400 hours of live sports a year, Eurosport DK will be the channel with the most live sports hours per year.  With sportsrights like football from Danish Superliga, Bundesliga, Major League Soccer, Capital One Cup, UEFA Euro 2016 qualifying, Tennis from ATP Tour, WTA Tour and 3 Grand Slam, Cycling from UCI World Tour, Winter sport, Motorsports and much more.

Sports Rights

Football
 UEFA Europa League (season 2012/13-2014/15)
 Danish Superliga (season 2012/13-2014/15)
 La Liga (season 2012/13-2014/15)
 Serie A (season 2012/13-2014/15)
 Copa del Rey (season 2012/13-2014/15)
 Major League Soccer (season 2012 & 2013)
 Allsvenskan (season 2012-2014)
 Eredivisie (season 2012/13-2013/14)
 Coupe de France (season 2012/13-2013/14)
 Emirates Cup (2013 & 2014)
 Barça TV (season 2012/13)
 Real Madrid TV (season 2012/13)
 Milan TV (2013)
 Arsenal TV (2013-2015)

Tennis
 ATP Tour (2012-2015)
 Various tournaments on the WTA Tour (2012-2015)
 Davis Cup (2012-2015)

Fighting
 UFC PPV (2012-2015)
 UFC Fight Night (2012-2015)
 The Ultimate Fighter (XIV-XV)
 Rumble Of The Kings (2012)
 UFC Unleashed (2012-2015)
 UFC Main Event (2012-2015)
 WEC Classic Events (2012-2013)

Motorsports
 Swedish Speedway Elitseries (2012-2015)
 Scandinavian Touring Car Championship (2012)
 IndyCar Series (2012-2014)
 British Speedway Elite League (2013-2014)

Ice hockey
 SHL (season 2012/13-2014/15)
 AHL All-Star Game (2014)

American Football
 Legends Football League (season2012/13)

Show Jumping and Dressage
 FEI Nations Cup (2012-2014)
 Dressage World Cup (2012-2014)

Programs from ESPN Classic
 30 for 30 (2012-2014)
 ESPN Classic Ringside (2012-2014)

References

External links
 Official website 

Defunct television channels in Denmark
Warner Bros. Discovery networks
Television channels and stations established in 2012
Television channels and stations disestablished in 2015
2012 establishments in Denmark
2015 disestablishments in Denmark